The Washington Square Arch, officially the Washington Arch, is a marble memorial arch in Washington Square Park, in the Greenwich Village neighborhood of Lower Manhattan, New York City. Designed by architect Stanford White in 1891, it commemorates the centennial of George Washington's 1789 inauguration as President of the United States, and forms the southern terminus of Fifth Avenue.

Description
Washington Arch, constructed of white Tuckahoe marble, was conceived by Stanford White, who imitated a Roman triumphal arch, namely the Arch of Titus, iconic monuments which Roman emperors built throughout the empire to celebrate a victory or event. Similarly, the angels on either side of the arch resemble those of the Sassanian-era arch of Taq Bostan. The monument's total height is 77 feet (23 m). The iconography of the Arch centers on images of war and peace. On the frieze are 13 large stars and 42 small stars, interspersed with capital "W"s. The spandrels contain figures of Victory.

The inscription on the attic story reads:

The north side of the eastern pier bears the sculpture George Washington as Commander-in-Chief, Accompanied by Fame and Valor (1914–1916) by Hermon A. MacNeil; the President is flanked by Fame (left) and Valor (right). The western pier has George Washington as President, Accompanied by Wisdom and Justice (1917–18) by Alexander Stirling Calder (father of Alexander Calder), with flanking  Justice (right) and Wisdom (left) figures. In the latter sculpture, a hand holds a book bearing the Latin phrase Exitus Acta Probat ("the end justifies the deed"). These sculptures are commonly referred to as Washington at War and Washington at Peace, respectively. These figures and most of the rest of the carving on the arch was performed by the Piccirilli Brothers.

History
In 1889, a large plaster and wood memorial arch was erected over Fifth Avenue just north of Washington Square Park by local businessman and philanthropist William Rhinelander Stewart (1852–1929). Stewart lived at 17 Washington Square North, and his friends contributed $2,765 toward the work. The temporary arch was so popular that more money was raised and, three years later, the permanent stone arch, designed by architect Stanford White, was erected.

The Arch was dedicated in 1895. In 1918, two statues of Washington were added to the north side.

By the late 20th century, the Washington Arch had become extensively defaced with spray-painted graffiti. It was cleaned and restored in 2003-04.

In modern times, the Washington Square Arch has become an unofficial symbol of New York University.

Trivia
Upon the last stone is carved a huge "P" in honor of Ignacy Jan Paderewski, the famous Polish pianist and 3rd Prime Minister of Poland, who donated $4,500 collected from one of his concerts in New York.

Gallery

See also
List of post-Roman triumphal arches

References

External links
 
 Guide to the Records of the Washington Arch, 1872–1925

Buildings and structures completed in 1892
1892 establishments in New York (state)
Monuments and memorials in Manhattan
Fifth Avenue
Greenwich Village
Latin inscriptions
Terminating vistas in the United States
Triumphal arches in the United States
Tourist attractions in Manhattan
Monuments and memorials to George Washington in the United States
George Washington in art
Sculptures carved by the Piccirilli Brothers
Vandalized works of art in New York City
New York (state) historical anniversaries